The Ukraine men's national under-18 basketball team is a national basketball team of Ukraine, administered by the Basketball Federation of Ukraine. It represents the country in men's international under-18 basketball competitions.

FIBA U18 European Championship participations

See also
Ukraine men's national basketball team
Ukraine men's national under-16 basketball team
Ukraine women's national under-18 basketball team

References

External links
Official website 
Archived records of Ukraine team participations

Ukraine men's national basketball team
Basketball
Men's national under-18 basketball teams